Lu Kun-chi (born 6 February 1985 in Tainan County (now part of Tainan City), Republic of China) is a Taiwanese football goalkeeper. Nicknamed Taiwanese Buffon (台灣布馮), he is the first choice goalkeeper in the Chinese Taipei national football team.

Biography

Early years
Lu was born in Tainan County, Taiwan. He has one brother and one sister, among whom he is the youngest. Lu started to play football at the age of 10 after his family moved to Jiali, another township in Tainan other than which he was born. He has played goalkeeper since age 11 in Jiali Primary School and Jiali Junior High School. 

When he was 14, his height reached 180 cm (5 ft 11 in). It was thought he was likely to be included in the Chinese Taipei U-15 squad, but he was not. "At that time, I told myself I should enter the [Chinese Taipei] youth team in three years," he said to the press after years.  Under the instruction of Pei Men goalkeeper coach Hung Chin-chang, he spent only two years to make his wish come true. He was called up to the Chinese Taipei U-21 at age 17, the U-23 at age 18, and eventually the senior team in 2004.

Chinese Taipei debut
Lu's Chinese Taipei senior team debut was on October 14, 2004 against Palestine in 2006 FIFA World Cup qualification. His amazing performance soon earned him a regular place in the national team. Since then, he has been the first choice goalkeeper for Chinese Taipei. He also performed well in domestic league. He has been voted as the Best Goalkeeper in the Chinese Taipei National Football League 2005 season at the time he plays for National Taiwan College of Physical Education.

Seeking opportunities in Japan
In June, 2005, Masakazu Suzuki, former manager of J. League side Júbilo Iwata, was invited to Taiwan to give lectures and to provide selection tests to Taiwanese talented youngsters. Lu took the test but did not perform himself because he was too nervous to keep his pace. 
One month later, supported by his professor Chao Jung-jui in Taiwan PE College, he went to Japan for the first time to accept the training tests provided by Yokohama FC and JEF United Ichihara Chiba. However, he failed to earn his position in both clubs. 

In October, 2006, with the recommendation of then Chinese Taipei manager Toshiaki Imai, Lu flew to Japan again to join the trainings with Yokohama F. Marinos for 2 weeks along with his teammate Chen Po-liang.

Grulla Morioka
After two months of waiting, although there was no update from Yokohama, Lu received an invitation from Grulla Morioka of the Japanese regional Tohoku League. He became the first Taiwanese male footballer to join a Japanese professional football club. On March 4, 2007, a press conference was held, and Grulla Morioka formally announced their signings of Lu and his compatriot Chuang Wei-lun, albeit the latter suddenly returned to Taiwan and failed to contract with the club afterwards. Lu's contract was confirmed on March 9, and he was assigned the number 22 shirt. On June 10, Lu made his debut for Grulla in the game against Furukawa Battery F.C., of which he substituted Kazuya Obara after 83 minutes. However, he was unable to prove himself and sidelined from first-team action. With Grulla Morioka's failure in the year-end JFL promotion tournament, Lu returned to Taiwan in December.

Returning to Taiwan
After returning to Taiwan, Lu was back to the National Taiwan College of Physical Education football team (as Molten Tso I) during the Enterprise Football League 2008 season. Then Lu served military service in National Sports Training Center football team and joined Taiwan Power Company F.C. afterwards.

Career statistics

References

External links
台灣第一門神呂昆錡的部落格, Lu Kun-chi's official blog 
扭轉乾"昆錡"開得勝, Lu Kun-chi's personal website at Wretch 
Lu Kun-chi joined Grulla

1985 births
Living people
Association football goalkeepers
Chinese Taipei international footballers
Expatriate footballers in Japan
Footballers from Tainan
Taiwan Power Company F.C. players
Taiwanese expatriate footballers
Taiwanese expatriate sportspeople in Japan
Taiwanese footballers